In computing and electronics, thermal pads (also called thermally conductive pad or thermal interface pad) are pre-formed rectangles of solid material (often paraffin wax or silicone based) commonly found on the underside of heatsinks to aid the conduction of heat away from the component being cooled (such as a CPU or another chip) and into the heatsink (usually made from aluminium or copper). Thermal pads and thermal compound are used to fill air gaps caused by imperfectly flat or smooth surfaces which should be in thermal contact; they would not be needed between perfectly flat and smooth surfaces. Thermal pads are relatively firm at room temperature, but become soft and are able to fill gaps at higher temperatures.

It is an alternative to thermal paste to be used as thermal interface material. AMD and Intel have included thermal pads on the bottom of heatsinks shipped with some of their processors, as they are cleaner and generally easier to install. However, thermal pads conduct heat less effectively than a minimal amount of thermal paste.

See also
 Computer cooling
 Hot-melt adhesive
 Phase-change material
 Thermal adhesive
 Thermal paste
 List of thermal conductivities

References 

Computer hardware cooling
Cooling technology
Heat conduction
Thermally conductive pad